Joe Cody (1952–1989) was a Quarter Horse stallion famous for siring reining horses.

Life

Joe Cody was registered with number 42,543 in the American Quarter Horse Association (or AQHA). He was a 1952 sorrel colt, bred by Tom W. Cochran of Buckholts, Texas. He was registered in the ownership of Robert F. Roberts of Tyler, Texas. His sire was a product of the King Ranch linebreeding program, as he was a son of Wimpy P-1 out of a daughter of Old Sorrel. Joe's dam was a daughter of King P-234.

Reining and cutting career 
Joe Cody earned an AQHA Champion and a Performance Register of Merit from the AQHA. When he earned his AQHA Championship, he was the youngest stallion to ever earn the award. He was trained and earned points in reining and cutting. He was also trained for team roping. In 1989 he was inducted into the National Reining Horse Association Hall of Fame, only the second horse so honored.

Breeding record 
After retiring to stud in 1961, Joe Cody was invited to Bermuda by the government of Bermuda to show both reining and cutting at the Agricultural Fair put on by the government. His owner at the time, Mrs. Virginia Harper of Long Island, New York, took him and had him perform a reining pattern and also a cutting exhibition. During his breeding career, he was the sire of Easter Cody, Sappho Cody, Paprika Cody, Sapphire Cody, High Proof, Topsail Cody, and Red God. His son Topsail Cody sired foals that earned over $1 million in NRHA earnings.

Death and honors 
Joe Cody died on July 1, 1989. Fuller buried him at Fuller's Willow Brook Farm in Catasauqua, Pennsylvania, with a granite headstone giving his accomplishments.

Joe Cody was inducted into the AQHA Hall of Fame in 1995.

Pedigree

Notes

References

 All Breed Pedigree Database Pedigree for Joe Cody retrieved on June 26, 2007
 AQHA Hall of Fame accessed on October 30, 2011
 
 
 NRHA Hall of Fame retrieved on September 4, 2017
 NRHA Million Dollar Earners retrieved on September 4, 2017

Further reading

External links
 Joe Cody at Quarter Horse Directory
 Joe Cody at Quarter Horse Legends

Reining horses
American Quarter Horse sires
1952 animal births
1989 animal deaths
AQHA Hall of Fame (horses)